David Dyson (born 3 April 1965) is an American bassist, songwriter, arranger, and producer. Throughout his career he has performed with an array of artists including New Kids on the Block, Meshell Ndegeocello, Lalah Hathaway, Pieces of a Dream, George Duke, Regina Bell, Jonathan Butler, Najee, Candy Dulfer, Rick Braun, Gerald Albright, Norman Brown, Bobby Lyle, Doc Powell, and Michael Franks.

Early life
Born David Reeves Dyson on 3 April 1965 in Rapid City, South Dakota. When he was two years old, his family relocated to the Washington metropolitan area where he was raised and attended school.  Dyson played the baritone (euphonium) in school, but was inspired to switch to the bass guitar at the age of twelve after hearing recordings of Larry Graham and Louis Johnson. At the age of fourteen, he decided that he wanted to pursue a career in music. After high school Dyson attended Berklee College of Music in Boston, Massachusetts, where he received a B.A. in 1988. Although he taught himself to play bass, Dyson did take several lessons while attending college.  He also learned to play the upright bass, piano, and guitar.

Musical career
After graduating from Berklee Dyson was offered a bassist position with recording artist Walter Beasley. He performed with him from 1988–1989. In the fall of 1988 producer Maurice Starr was searching for musicians for New Kids on the Block. Dyson auditioned and landed the gig. He toured with them from 1989–1992 as their bassist and musical director. In 1992 he was a bassist and composer with Chico Freeman and Brainstorm. From 1993–present Dyson has toured and recorded with Michael Franks, Greg Osby, Terumasa Hino, Gary Thomas, Kevin Toney, Takeshi Itoh, Jack Lee, and Bob James. He was a bassist with Steve Coleman and Five Elements in 1996. Two grammy nominations as a bassist, composer, and co-producer with the Hagans/Belden band (trumpeter Tim Hagans and producer Bob Belden) from 1999 and presently. Dyson began touring with Meshell Ndegeocello in May 1997. He continued through 1999 and from 2001–2002. From 2003–2006 he was a bassist with Jonathan Butler. He began playing with Pieces of a Dream in 2000 at a concert in Baltimore, Maryland after substituting for the original bassist.  Dyson performed with Peter White from 2005–present, Chuck Brown 2006–2007, and Lalah Hathaway 2008–present. In addition, Dyson was a member of the Towson University faculty as a bass instructor in the department of music. He is currently instructing the course David Dyson's Groove Concepts at MusicDojo.com. Dyson is a faculty member of InDepth Jazz clinics & concerts and an instructor with Gerald Veasley's Bass BootCamp and Bass Break LIVE. He is a staff writer for Bass Musician magazine. He is the founder and president of Lil Doc Productions and Lohandfunk Records. Dyson released his debut CD Soulmates in 2000, The Dawning in 2004, and Unleashed in 2008.

Custom bass
In 2008 Dyson was presented with his first David Dyson/Lohandfunk signature series bass created by Pete Skjold. The specifications are:  5 string fretted, ash body, myrtle top, maple fingerboard, maple pick up covers and knobs, 5 piece maple/purpleheart neck, 2-SC-1 pick ups, audere 4-band pre w/5-position z-mode rotary switch – standard (also available with the Skjold/east custom pre-amp). In 2011 Dyson debuted his fretless Skjold signature series bass at the NAMM Show in Anaheim, California.

David Dyson also has several signature series cheesecakes created by Imagine Cheesecake.  They include the Banana Candy Supreme and the Triple Chocolate Mocha Bass Kiss.

Discography

As leader/composer
 Soulmates (Lightyear, 1999)
 The Dawning (2004)
 Unleashed (Lo Hand Funk, 2008)

As sideman
With Bob Belden
 Strawberry Fields (1996)
 Tapestry (1997)
 Black Dahlia (2001)

With Steve Coleman
 The Opening of the Way (1996)
 Genesis (1997)

Also as composer/co-producer
With Tim Hagans
 Animation, Imagination (1999) Grammy nomination
 Re-Animation Live (2000) Grammy nomination

With Unit 3 Deep
 Groove Theory (2017)

With Tracy Hamlin
 Seasons (2005)
 Better Days (2009)

With Marcus Johnson
Urban Grooves (2000)
 Just Doing What I Do (2004)
 In Concert for a Cause (2006)
 Phoenix (2007)
 This is How I Rock (2010)

With Jack Lee
 Gracefulee (1993)
 Where My Heart Goes (1996)
 Into the Night (1997)
 Message from Paris (2000)
 Belo to Soul (2002)

With Pieces of a Dream
 Acquainted With the Night (2001)
 Love's Silhouette (2002)
 No Assembly Required (2004)
 Soul Intent (2009)

With others
 Philip Bailey – Soul on Jazz (2002)
 Rick Braun – Yours Truly (2006)
 Jonathan Butler – Jonathan (2005)
 Chico Freeman  – Threshold (1992)
 Ron Holloway – Live at the Montpelier Cultural Center (2003)
 Jaared – Forward (2001)
 Jackiem Joyner – Baby Soul (2007)
 Masabumi Kikuchi, DJ Katsuya, DJ Hiro – Raw Material No. 1, M. Kikuchi (1996)
 Bobby Lyle – Straight & Smooth (2004)
 Najee – Rising Sun (2009)
 Meshell Ndegeocello – Lilith Fair Vol. 3 (1999)
 New Kids on the Block – Step by Step (1990)
 Scritti Politti – Anomie & Bonhomie (1999)
 John Stoddart – Love So Real (1997)
 Peter White – Playin Favorites (2006)
 Alyson Williams – It's About Time (2004)
 Frederic Yonnet – Front & Center (2004)

References

External links 
 David Dyson  on My Space
 David Dyson interview/performance on Voice of America

1965 births
20th-century American bass guitarists
20th-century American male musicians
African-American guitarists
American funk bass guitarists
American jazz bass guitarists
American male bass guitarists
American music arrangers
Berklee College of Music alumni
Jazz fusion bass guitarists
Living people
American male jazz musicians
People from Rapid City, South Dakota
Smooth jazz bass guitarists
20th-century African-American musicians
21st-century African-American people